Drepana arcuata, the arched hooktip or masked birch caterpillar, is a moth of the family Drepanidae. The species was first described by Francis Walker in 1855. It is found from Newfoundland to Vancouver Island, south to at least North Carolina, South Carolina and California.

Adults are on wing from mid-May through late-July. There is one generation per year in the north.

The larvae feed on Betula papyrifera and Alnus species, which they may use as a medium to communicate. Sound is produced by shaking their bodies, drumming and scraping their mouthparts, or dragging specialised anal "oars" against the surface of a leaf. Larvae build communal silk shelters and the sounds may attract other larva to the shelter.

References

External links

Drepaninae
Moths described in 1855
Moths of North America
Taxa named by Francis Walker (entomologist)